Terry O'Neill may refer to:
 Terry O'Neill (feminist), American attorney, professor and activist for social justice, president of NOW
 Terry O'Neill (footballer) (born 1956), Australian rules footballer
 Terry O'Neill (martial artist) (born 1948), British martial artist and actor
 Terry O'Neill (photographer) (1938–2019), British photographer

See also
 Terence O'Neill (1914–1990), Prime Minister of Northern Ireland
 Terry a. O'Neal (born 1973), American writer